Tyler Pursel is an American songwriter, producer, recording engineer and session instrumentalist.

Work
Pursel began as a touring keyboardist and occasional guitarist for Gym Class Heroes in 2006. In 2007, he arranged and produced the dance-pop album Regional Community Theater by Ladybirds, and played keyboards on Stronger, Faster, Science by Grace Gale. Pursel received writing credit for several songs on The Papercut Chronicles II in 2011. Aside from touring and session work, Pursel runs his own studio Walnut Room Recordings in the suburbs of Philadelphia. The studio concentrates on documenting the works of local artists and creating original music for films, such as the independent film Namour. He also works on commercials and for MTV, FOX and the E! Network. Pursel plays guitar with the Philadelphia post-hardcore band Goddamnit.

Discography
Regional Community Theater (2007) by Ladybirds
Stronger, Faster, Science (2008) by Grace Gale 
Impending Doom Is Northern Bound (2009) by Tyler Pursel 
The Doom Of Man (2010) by Willing Swords
5 Song Demo (2010) by Selfish
The Papercut Chronicles II (2011) by Gym Class Heroes
Conversations with the Man to My Left (2011) by Polar Shift
We Are The Starwalkers (2012) by Eagleegg
Wavelengths (2013) by Memorygardens
Russian Cowboys (2013) by Karpets
How To Take The Burn (2014) by Goddamnit
The American Mile (2015) by The American Mile
I (2015) by Yves
II (2015) by Yves
"Fever Dreams/Come Undone (2015) by Drvglvngs
Here Is A List Of Things That Exist (2015) by The Rentiers
Here I Am (2015) by Ray Adkins
Fell Off The Deep End (2015) by Neaux
Endless (2015) by Weakbody
Death Of Saul (2016) by Death Of Saul
Danny Justice (2016) by Danny Justice
I'll Never Be Okay, I'll Never Be The Same (2016) by Goddamnit
I Can Feel Myself Sinking (2016) by Weakbody
Election Year (2016) by Hoagie
Chain Up The Sun (2017) by Neaux
Houseplant (2017) by Houseplant

References

Citations

Bibliography

External links

1983 births
American pop keyboardists
Gym Class Heroes members
Living people